The coat of arms of Australia, officially called the Commonwealth Coat of Arms, is the formal symbol of the Commonwealth of Australia. A shield, depicting symbols of Australia's six states, is held up by the native Australian animals, the kangaroo and the emu. The seven-pointed Commonwealth Star surmounting the crest also represents the states and territories, while floral emblems appear below the shield.

The first arms were authorised by King Edward VII on 7 May 1908, and the current version by King George V on 19 September 1912, although the 1908 version continued to be used in some contexts, notably appearing on the reverse of the sixpenny coin.

Design
The escutcheon is the focal point of the coat of arms, contained within is the badge of each Australian state, the whole surrounded by an ermine border representing the federation of the states.

In the top half, from left to right, the states represented are: New South Wales, Victoria and Queensland. In the bottom half, from left to right: South Australia, Western Australia, and Tasmania. Above the shield is the seven-pointed Commonwealth Star or Star of Federation above a blue and gold wreath, forming the crest. Six of the points on the star represent the original six states, while the seventh point represents the combined territories and any future states of Australia. In its entirety the shield represents the federation of Australia.

The red kangaroo and emu that support the shield have never been designated as official animal emblems of the nation. They owe their unofficial recognition to the fact that they are endemic Australian fauna (found only on that continent), and likely chosen because they are the most well-known native Australian animals large enough to be positioned together in scale holding up the shield. They were chosen to symbolise a nation moving forward, based on the fact that neither animal can move backwards easily – i.e. symbolising progress. It has been claimed that the kangaroo is, and must be seen to be, male.

In the background is wreath of golden wattle, the official national floral emblem, though the representation of the species is not botanically accurate. At the bottom is a scroll that contains the name of the nation. Neither the wreath of wattle nor the scroll are technically part of the design, because they are not described on the Royal Warrant that grants the armorial design.

Blazon 
The official blazon of the Commonwealth was included within a Royal Warrant of King George V on 19 September 1912, making the Arms officially adopted. The blazon is as follows:

History

Following the federation of Australia, the first official coat of arms of Australia was granted by King Edward VII on 7 May 1908. The original design is thought to have been inspired by the 1805 Bowman Flag, which showed the rose, shamrock and thistle supported by a kangaroo and emu. 

It consisted of a shield in the centre, the seven pointed star on a wreath as the crest above it, and a kangaroo and an emu using its foot to help the kangaroo to support the shield, all on a bed of green grass with a scroll containing the motto "Advance Australia". The selection of the kangaroo, the emu and the words, "Advance Australia" was tied together symbolically. The shield had a white background, with a red cross of Saint George, blue lines outside the cross, and a blue border containing six inescutcheons featuring a red chevron on white, representing the six states. The Scottish Patriotic Association was vocally opposed to the shield's design, noting that it should display the Union Jack to represent British and Irish settlers. These arms were used by the government and appeared on the sixpence coin from 1910 until 1963, and the threepence, shilling and florin from 1910 to 1936.

The 1908 arms were redesigned in 1911, and officially granted by George V on 19 September 1912. The redesign spurred much debate in Parliament. The Member for Wentworth, Willie Kelly, said:
"The emu and kangaroo are so built that they hardly fit into the heraldic atmosphere, and I think we make ourselves ridiculous when we endeavour to carry on the traditions of the Old World with some of the wild creations of our Australian fauna."

Despite objections, the kangaroo and emu now not having its leg up remained the shield bearers in the new coat of arms and were modified to appear more realistic. The principal reason for the redesign was the concern that Australia's states were not individually represented; that was achieved by showing each state's heraldic badge on the shield. The new coat of arms removed the bed of grass beneath the shield and changed the scroll to read simply "Australia". The colours in the wreath were also changed from blue and white to blue and gold. A background of two sprays of golden wattle was added, but it has never been an official part of the armorial bearings, even though the golden wattle was proclaimed Australia's national flower on 19 August 1988 by the Governor-General Sir Ninian Stephen.

The use of each state's badge had been a feature of the first Great Seal of Australia, introduced on 21 January 1904, where they surrounded the UK Royal Arms; according to Charles R. Wylie, badges were used because South Australia and Western Australia did not yet have coats of arms.

Use

The Commonwealth Coat of Arms is the formal symbol of the Commonwealth of Australia that signifies Commonwealth authority and ownership. The Arms are used by Australian Government departments and agencies, statutory and non-statutory authorities, the Parliament and Commonwealth courts and tribunals. Senators and Federal Members of the Australian Parliament may also use the Arms in the course of their duties as Parliamentarians. The coat of arms should never be used where it could wrongly imply a formal guarantee, sponsorship or endorsement by the Commonwealth. Use of the arms by private citizens or organisations is rarely permitted; however, there are provisions for use by sporting bodies and in educational publications. Use of the coat of arms without permission may be in breach of Sections 53 (c) (d) and (e) of the Trade Practices Act 1974, Section 145.1 of the Criminal Code Act 1995 or Section 39(2) of the Trade Marks Act 1995. The import of goods bearing the arms is also illegal according to the Customs (Prohibited Imports) Regulations.

There is a full colour version and nine heraldically correct official versions exist for single-colour reproduction.

The coat of arms is the basis of the King's Personal Australian Flag, and since 1973 a slightly modified version has formed the basis of the Great Seal of Australia.

The coat of arms has appeared on Australian coinage since the coins for the Australian pound were minted in the early 20th century. Until 1936, the 1908 coat of arms featured on the reverse of all silver coins in regular circulation(3d, 6d, 1'/, 2'/). After 1936, the current coat of arms was featured on the reverse of the Florin (2'/), while the 1908 arms remained on the sixpence (6d). Since decimalisation in 1966, the current coat of arms has featured on the reverse of both variants of the 50-cent coin.

The coat of arms is used as badge of rank for Warrant Officers Class 1 (Army) and Warrant Officer (Navy and Air Force). A more stylised version is used as a badge of rank for Warrant Officer of the Navy, Regimental Sergeant Major of the Army and Warrant Officer of the Air Force.

States and territories

Cities

Coins

See also

 Flag of Australia
 National colours of Australia
 Australian heraldry

References

External links
 Official website with more information
 National Archives of Australia. Papers relating to the Commonwealth Coat of Arms 
 Online Exhibition commemorating the Centenary of the NSW Coat of Arms 1906–2006 The designer of the NSW Coat of Arms, William Gullick, was also involved in the creation of the Australian Coat of Arms

Australia
Australia
National symbols of Australia
Australia
Australia
Australia
Australia
Australia
Australia